{{DISPLAYTITLE:C40H56O4}}
The molecular formula C40H56O4 (molar mass: 600.85 g/mol, exact mass: 600.4179 u) may refer to:

 Capsorubin
 Neoxanthin
 Violaxanthin

Molecular formulas